() is a district of Putian, Fujian province, People's Republic of China. It ranges in latitude from 25°23' to 25° 27'N and longitude from 119° 04' to 119°10'E. It is located in the middle of the Fujian coast, bordering the Taiwan Strait to the east, south to "triangle of the gold austral Fujian".

History
In 627, Hanjiang got its original name of "Hantou", which means it was the head of a sluice that was built at that time. In the Song Dynasty, it was given the name of "Hanjiang".

Administrative divisions
Hanjiang contains 2 street offices, 9 towns, 1 village: Handong, Hanxi, Sanjiangkou, Baitang, Guohuan, Jiangkou, Wutang, Qiulu, Baisha, Zhuangbian, Xinxian, Dayang. The district government is located in Handong Street.

Geography
With a total area of around 752 square kilometers, Hanjiang is in the north of the estuary of Mulan Stream, and in the west of the Xinghua Bay. It has the National Road 324, Fuzhou-Xiamen Highway, Xingyou Highway, Fuzhou-Xiamen Railway, and Xiangpu Railway in its region. The Hanjiang railway station is located in Jiangkou town.

Climate
Hanjiang has a monsoonal subtropical marine climate, characterised by long, cool and humid summers and short, mild and dry winters. The average annual temperature is 20.2 °C,  with an annual sunlight of 1943 hours and annual precipitation of 1,289mm.

Demographics
According to the 2010 Census, Hanjiang has a population of 470,097 inhabitants, or 16.92% of the population of Putian.

Natural Resources

Mineral Resources
The Hanjiang district has abundant non-metal mineral deposits: reserves of brick and tile clay reach  one hundred million tons; granite is over one million cubic meters; and construction sand and mineral water are also plentiful.

Living Resources
Hanjiang is a part of Mulan Stream Plain, which is rich in rice, wheat, sweet potato, soybean, peanut and vegetable. Lychee, longan, loquat, and persimmon are the four main fruits. Seafood such as oysters, sea worms, clams, fish, octopus, especially eel and prawns are well-known both inside and outside the province.

Geothermal Resources
The geothermal water temperature is between 30 °C and 60 °C, which is a very favourable temperature to exploit.

Port Resources
Hanjiang has a good natural harbour — Hanjiang Harbour, whose total water line around Xinghua Bay is 19.6 kilometers and the whole Channel length is 43.88 kilometers. The convenient navigation helped the formation of Sanjiangkou Bay and Jiangkou operation area in the history.

Economy
By 2008, Hanjiang's GDP amounted to 17.83 billion yuan, an increase of 18.7%. The first, second, and third industry respectively added value 1219 million yuan, 1291 million yuan, and 3701 million yuan, with increases of 6.4%, 22.1%, and 11.4%.

References

County-level divisions of Fujian
Putian